Andreas Luthe (born 10 March 1987) is a German professional footballer who plays as a goalkeeper for 2. Bundesliga club 1. FC Kaiserslautern.

Career
Luthe began his career with SuS Niederbonsfeld and joined later to Borussia Velbert, from here was in 2001 scouted from VfL Bochum. After four years with VfL Bochum's youth side, he was promoted to the reserve team in 2006 and played until 2010 75 matches. Luthe was called up as back-up keeper to the Bundesliga team for the 2009–10 season.

On 13 June 2022  1. FC Kaiserslautern announced the signing of Luthe from Union Berlin.

Career statistics

References

External links
 

1987 births
Living people
People from Velbert
Sportspeople from Düsseldorf (region)
German footballers
Footballers from North Rhine-Westphalia
Association football goalkeepers
Bundesliga players
2. Bundesliga players
VfL Bochum players
VfL Bochum II players
FC Augsburg players
1. FC Union Berlin players
1. FC Kaiserslautern players